Axel Arne Berg (3 December 1909 – 15 February 1997) was a Swedish road racing cyclist who competed in the 1932 and 1936 Summer Olympics. In 1932 he finished 20th individually and won a team bronze medal. Four years later he finished 16th in the individual road race. The Swedish road racing team was unplaced, because Berg was the only Swedish finisher.

After retiring from competitions Berg worked as a motor mechanic.

References

1909 births
1997 deaths
Swedish male cyclists
Olympic cyclists of Sweden
Cyclists at the 1932 Summer Olympics
Cyclists at the 1936 Summer Olympics
Olympic bronze medalists for Sweden
Olympic medalists in cycling
People from Nynäshamn Municipality
Medalists at the 1932 Summer Olympics
Sportspeople from Stockholm County
20th-century Swedish people